Prior to its uniform adoption of proportional representation in 1999, the United Kingdom used first-past-the-post for the European elections in England, Scotland and Wales. The European Parliament constituencies used under that system were smaller than the later regional constituencies and only had one Member of the European Parliament each.

The constituency of Leicester was one of them.

Boundaries 
1979-1984: Carlton, Leicester East, Leicester South, Leicester West, Melton, Newark, Rushcliffe.

1984-1994: Bosworth, Leicester East, Leicester South, Leicester West, Loughborough, North Warwickshire, Nuneaton, Rutland and Melton.

1994-1999: Harborough, Leicester East, Leicester South, Leicester West, Loughborough, Rutland and Melton, Stamford and Spalding.

Members of the European Parliament

Elections

References

External links
 David Boothroyd's United Kingdom Election Results

European Parliament constituencies in England (1979–1999)
Politics of Leicester
1979 establishments in England
1999 disestablishments in England
Constituencies established in 1979
Constituencies disestablished in 1999